The 2018–19 Penn Quakers women's basketball team represents the University of Pennsylvania during the 2018–19 NCAA Division I women's basketball season. The Quakers, led by tenth year head coach Mike McLaughlin, play their home games at the Palestra and were members of the Ivy League. They finished the season 24–7, 12–2 to share the Ivy League regular season title with Princeton. They advanced to the championship game of the Ivy League women's tournament where they lost to Princeton. They received an automatic trip to the Women's National Invitation Tournament where they defeated American in the first before losing to Providence in the second round.

Roster

Schedule

|-
!colspan=8 style=| Regular season

|-
!colspan=9 style=| Ivy League Women's Tournament

|-
!colspan=9 style=| WNIT

See also
 2018–19 Penn Quakers men's basketball team

References

Penn
Penn Quakers women's basketball seasons
Penn
Penn
Penn